Natalyino is a rural locality (a selo) in Natalyinsky Selsoviet of Blagoveshchensky District, Amur Oblast, Russia. The population was 303 as of 2018. There are 5 streets.

Geography 
Natalyino is located on the right bank of the Zeya River, 91 km north of Blagoveshchensk (the district's administrative centre) by road. Svetilovka is the nearest rural locality.

References 

Rural localities in Blagoveshchensky District, Amur Oblast